Laila Zajdenweber Kelson, commonly known as Laila Zaid (born May 28, 1984), is a Brazilian actress.

Career 

She started to study theatre around the time she entered college, in 2003, and made her acting debut in the playA Midsummer Night's Dream. In 2004, she interpreted the waitress Bel in the telenovela Malhação for TV Globo, her first major acting role. She worked in Malhação for three years. In 2007, she was invited to star in the TV series Mandrake. In 2008, Zaid moved to RecordTV and landed a role in the novela Amor e Intrigas. Later, she worked on Bela, a Feia, interpreting the manicurist Magdalena.

In 2011, she made her film debut as Luna in Tainá 3 and later had a role in Somos tão Jovens, a biopic about Renato Russo. In 2012, after her contract with RecordTV ended, Zeid came back to TV Globo for a role in As Brasileiras and later was part of the cast for Amor Eterno Amor. In 2013 Zeid joined the cast of Além do Horizonte, her last work for Globo. In 2016, she moved to Band, and later worked on Terminadores.

Personal life 

She is the daughter of actress Francis Waimberg and Sami Zajdenweber. She has a degree in advertising from PUC-RJ.

Laila Zaid was born to a German Jewish family. She married economist Marco Kelson in 2009.

Filmography

Television

Cinema

Theatre

Awards and nominations

References

External links 

 

Brazilian people of German descent
Brazilian television actresses
Brazilian stage actresses
Brazilian film actresses
Pontifical Catholic University of Rio de Janeiro alumni
1984 births
Living people